Rhaphanidosis is the act of inserting the root of a plant of the genus Raphanus (commonly known as a radish) into the anus. It is mentioned by Aristophanes as a punishment for adultery in Classical Athens in the fifth and fourth century BC. It is also allegedly a punishment for other sex-related crimes, such as promiscuity and sodomy. 
Later classical references to the punishment include Catullus 15 where percurrent raphanique mugilesque (both radishes and mullets will run you through) is threatened against those who cast lascivious eyes on the poet's boyfriend.

There is some doubt as to whether the punishment was ever enforced or whether the reference to it in the debate between Right and Wrong in The Clouds of Aristophanes should be understood as signifying public humiliation in general. However, Nigette Spikes has it that when enforced as a capital punishment, tubers so deposited were chosen to be as rough as possible so as to cause death by internal hemorrhaging.

See also
 Figging
 Gingering

References

 Danielle S. Allen, The world of Prometheus: the politics of punishing in democratic Athens, Princeton University Press, 2002, p. 214.
 C. Carey, "Return of the radish or just when you thought it safe to go back into the kitchen," Liverpool Classical Monthly, vol.18 no.4 (1993) pp. 53–5.
 Charles Platter, "Aristophanes and the carnival of genres", JHU Press, 2007, p. 79.
 James Davidson, Clinging to the Sides of a Black, Precipitous Hole, London Review of Books, vol.22 no.16 (24 August 2000)
 Vincent J. Rosivach, Sources of Some Errors in Catullan Commentaries, Transactions of the American Philological Association, Vol.108 (1978) pp. 203–216
 Eva Cantarella, Pandora's daughters: the role and status of women in Greek and Roman antiquity, Johns Hopkins University Press, 1987, p. 123
 Kenneth Dover: Greek homosexuality. London 1978
 David Cohen: A note on Aristophanes and the Punishment of Adultery in Athenian Law. In: Zeitschrift der Savigny-Stiftung für Rechtsgeschichte: Romanistische Abteilung. Issue 102, 1985, p. 385–387

Ancient Greek law
Corporal punishments
Radishes
Anus